Events from the year 1565 in art.

Events
September - Titian goes to Cadore to design decorations for the church at Pieve, which will be partly executed by his pupils.
Before December - Daniele da Volterra begins the work of overpainting nudity in the late Michelangelo's The Last Judgment (Sistine Chapel), earning himself the nickname Il Braghettone ("the breeches maker").

Works

Paintings
 Pieter Bruegel the Elder paints
the cycle of the seasons
The Hunters in the Snow (winter) in the Kunsthistorisches Museum.
The Gloomy Day (old beginning of the year in March) in the Kunsthistorisches Museum.
The Hay Harvest (early summer) in Nelahozeves (Czech Republic).
The Harvesters (late summer) in the Metropolitan Museum of Art of New York.
The Return of the Herd (autumn) in the Kunsthistorisches Museum.
Winter Landscape with Skaters and Bird Trap.
Christ and the Woman Taken in Adultery.
 Lucas Cranach the Younger paints the Altarpiece of the Reformers in Dessau.
 Sebastiano Filippi (Bastianino) paints Birth of the Virgin.
 Tintoretto begins painting the cycle of the life of Christ (completed 1567), including Crucifixion, in the Sala dell'Albergo (Hall of the Hostel) at the Scuola di San Rocco in Venice.
 Titian paints
The Penitent Magdalene.
Venus Blindfolding Cupid at about this date.
 Giorgio Vasari paints the frescoes on the walls of the Palazzo Vecchio representing scenes of the Austrian Habsburg estates.
Paolo Veronese paints the Allegory of Virtue and Vice and Wisdom and Strength in Venice, Italy.

Births
May 15 - Hendrick de Keyser, Dutch sculptor and architect (died 1621)
June 2 - Francisco Ribalta, Spanish painter, mostly of religious subjects (died 1628)
date unknown
Bernardino Cesari, Italian painter (died 1621)
Camillo Mariani, Italian sculptor of the early Baroque (died 1611)
Konoe Nobutada, Momoyama period Japanese poet, calligrapher, painter and diarist (died 1614)
Isaac Oliver, French-born English portrait miniature painter (died 1617)
Jan Saenredam, Dutch engraver (died 1607)
Decio Termisani, Naples-born Italian painter (died 1600)
probable
Reza Abbasi, Persian miniaturist, painter and calligrapher of the Isfahan School (died 1635)
Achille Calici, Italian painter (died unknown)
Cheng Jiasui, Chinese landscape painter and poet during the Ming Dynasty (died 1643)
Jacob de Gheyn II, Dutch painter and engraver (died 1629)

Deaths
date unknown
Antonio Begarelli ("Begarino"), Italian sculptor (born 1499)
Antonio Bernieri, Italian painter, pupil of Correggio (born 1516)
Bernardino Licinio, Italian painter (born c.1489)
Pietro Negroni, Italian painter (born c.1505)
Paolo Pino, Italian painter and art writer (born 1534)
Joseph Weiß, Germain painter (born c.1486)
probable - Garcia Fernandes, Portuguese Renaissance painter (born unknown)

References

 
Years of the 16th century in art